Stonehouse is a comet, designated C/1998 H1, discovered by observer Patrick L. Stonehouse of Wolverine, Michigan, USA.

With a maximal brightness of about 10th magnitude in April/May, 1998, Comet Stonehouse was too faint to be seen by the unaided eye, but was a popular object for telescope-equipped comet watchers.

References

External links 
 

Non-periodic comets